Ptychoptera quadrifasciata is a species of phantom crane flies in the family Ptychopteridae.

References

Ptychopteridae
Articles created by Qbugbot
Insects described in 1824